Cathy Linh Che is a Vietnamese American poet from Los Angeles. She won the Kundiman Poetry prize, the Norma Farber First Book Award from the Poetry Society of America, and the Best Poetry Book Award from the Association for Asian American Studies for her book Split.

Life 
Cathy Linh Che attended Reed College and New York University where she received her Bachelor of Arts and Master of Fine Arts degrees. In an interview done by Emerson College, Che states, "I was raised in Highland Park in a working class Asian and Latinx immigrant community. So, while there were plenty of clashes between my parents and me, it was something that everyone around me experienced so I never felt different or alone until going away to college."

In 2018, she helped organize the Kundiman "Because We Come From Everything" project. She participated in the digital project the "Poetics of Haunting," curated by Jane Wong.

Writing career 
When asked in an interview at Emerson College of what brought Cathy Linh Che to poetry, Che responded saying:
"I would have to say that my parents brought me to poetry. Though neither one is a poet, my upbringing was filled with their stories. While sitting at the dinner table, my parents would tell me about their lives during the Vietnam War, the year in a refugee camp, their first years in the U.S. When I began writing, their voices demanded to be told. I couldn't help but see their stories as fundamentally part of my own."

Che is currently the Executive Director at Kundiman.

Che's most recognized work comes from a book called Split, "which contains poems on the psychological, sexual, and abusive effects of war."

Awards 
Throughout Cathy Linh Che's career, several awards have been pinned to her name, such as The Kundiman Poetry Prize, the Norma Farber First Book Award from the Poetry Society of America, and The Best Poetry Book Award from the Association of Asian American Studies.

Works 
Split, Alice James Books, 2014. 
Hair : poems: a collection of cuts and ties,  Reed College, 2002. 
Split, Chestertown, Maryland: Literary House Press, 2016. 

Anthologies

Laren McClung; Yusef Komunyakaa (eds) Inheriting the war : poetry and prose by descendants of Vietnam veterans and refugees, New York : W.W. Norton & Company, 2018. ,

References

External links 

 

 

Living people
Year of birth missing (living people)
Writers from Los Angeles
American women poets
American people of Vietnamese descent
Reed College alumni
New York University alumni
21st-century American women